Lansdowne or Lansdown may refer to:

People
 Lansdown Guilding (1797–1831), Saint Vincent and the Grenadines naturalist and engraver
Fenwick Lansdowne (1937–2008), Canadian wildlife artist
 George Granville, 1st Baron Lansdowne (1666–1735) 
 Marquess of Lansdowne, title in the Peerage of Great Britain
 William Petty, 2nd Earl of Shelburne, William Petty, 1st Marquess of Lansdowne, (1737–1805), prime minister  1782–83
 Henry Petty-Fitzmaurice, 5th Marquess of Lansdowne (1845–1927), Governor General of Canada, Viceroy of India, Secretary of State for War, and Secretary of State for Foreign Affairs
 Zachary Lansdowne (1888–1925), American naval officer and aviator

Places

Australia
 Lansdowne, New South Wales, Sydney
 Lansdowne, New South Wales (Mid-Coast Council)
 Lansdowne, Northern Territory
 Lansdowne, Queensland, locality in the Blackall-Tambo Region
Lansdowne County, Western Australia

Canada
 Lansdowne, Edmonton, Alberta
 Lansdowne, Nova Scotia
 Lansdowne, Ontario
 Lansdowne (electoral district), Manitoba
 Lansdowne Avenue, Toronto, Ontario
 Lansdowne Park, Ottawa, Ontario
 Lansdowne Centre, Richmond, British Columbia
 Lansdowne, Yukon

India
 Lansdowne, India, cantonment town in Uttarakhand
Lansdowne (Uttarakhand Assembly constituency)
 Lansdowne Road, Kolkata, now known as Sarat Bose Road

Ireland
 Lansdowne Road, a former sports stadium in Dublin whose site is occupied by the current Aviva Stadium

New Caledonia
 Lansdowne Bank

New Zealand
 Lansdowne, Christchurch, a locality south of Christchurch
 Lansdowne, Masterton

South Africa
  Lansdowne, Cape Town

United Kingdom
 Lansdown, Bath
 Lansdown Crescent, Bath
 Lansdown, Charlcombe, hamlet near Bath
Lansdowne, Bournemouth
 Lansdown, Cheltenham
Lansdowne Crescent, London
 Lansdowne House, London
 Lansdowne School, London
 Lansdowne College, London
 Lansdowne Club, London
 Lansdowne Primary School, Cardiff, Wales

United States
 Lansdowne, Lexington, Kentucky
 Lansdowne, Maryland
 Lansdowne (Centreville, Maryland) 
 Lansdowne-Baltimore Highlands, Maryland
 Lansdowne (Natchez, Mississippi), a plantation
 Lansdowne station (MBTA) on MBTA Commuter Rail's Framingham/Worcester Line
 Lansdowne, New Jersey
 Lansdown (Pittstown, New Jersey), nearby historic house listed on the NRHP
 Lansdowne Airport, Ohio
 Lansdowne House (Greenville, Ohio)
 Lansdowne, Pennsylvania
 East Lansdowne, Pennsylvania
 Lansdowne, Virginia
 Lansdowne (Urbanna, Virginia), a historic home
 Lansdowne (Fredericksburg, Virginia), a historic home

Other uses
 Battle of Lansdowne, 1643
 Lansdown (film), 2002 film
 Lansdowne Bridge (Pakistan)
 Lansdown Cricket Club, Bath, England
 Lansdowne Football Club, rugby football club in Ireland
 Lansdowne Letter
 Lansdowne portrait, of George Washington
 Lansdowne station (disambiguation), stations of the name
 SS Lansdowne, railroad car ferry and floating restaurant
 USS Lansdowne (DD-486), a Gleaves-class destroyer